The 2020 ANA Inspiration was the 49th ANA Inspiration LPGA golf tournament, held on the Dinah Shore Tournament Course at Mission Hills Country Club in Rancho Mirage, California. Originally scheduled for April 2–5, the tournament was postponed to September 10–13, due to the COVID-19 pandemic. This was its 38th year as an LPGA major championship, and it was the second major of 2020 following the AIG Women's Open, held in August.

The championship was held in a bubble and behind closed doors, although residents of the Mission Hills gated community were able to watch from within the boundaries of their own homes. A large blue colored structure, dubbed the "Big Blue Wall", was erected behind the 18th green, where a grandstand would normally have been, in order to promote the championships main sponsor. This attracted much criticism since it served as a backstop, preventing approach shots from going into the water behind the green.

Players could also ride in carts during practice rounds, but were still required to walk during the tournament.

Mirim Lee won her first major championship with a birdie at the first extra hole of a playoff with Brooke Henderson and Nelly Korda. The three had tied at 273 (15-under-par) after 72 holes. The big blue wall played its part, as both Lee and Henderson used the backstop on the final hole of regulation play to make eagle and birdie respectively to tie Korda, who could only make par.

Field
Players were eligible to compete in the ANA Inspiration by means of various qualification criteria. Those who received exemptions included past champions, recent LPGA major winners, leading players from the LPGA Tour and the U.S. Women's Amateur champion. On September 4, a field of 105 players was confirmed.

Seven past champions were in the field; Pernilla Lindberg, Lydia Ko, Brittany Lincicome, Lexi Thompson, Stacy Lewis, Morgan Pressel and seven-time major winner Inbee Park. Other leading contenders included 2017 Women's PGA Champion and world number two Danielle Kang, world number three Nelly Korda, and two-time major winner and world number four Park Sung-hyun. Among the six amateurs in the field were U.S. Women's Amateur champions Rose Zhang (2020) and Gabriela Ruffels (2019).

Several past champions did not compete; they included defending champion and world number one Ko Jin-young and 2017 winner Ryu So-yeon. Also missing were many other leading South Korean players, including Kim Hyo-joo and Lee Jeong-eun, numbers 10 and 11 respectively in the world rankings. 2020 Women's British Open champion Sophia Popov was also not in the field as her exemption for winning the first major of 2020 was not active until 2021.

Two days prior to the tournament starting, England's world number 28 Charley Hull was forced to withdraw from the field after testing positive for COVID-19. The LPGA reported that no other players had returned a positive test.

Qualification criteria

1. Active LPGA Tour Hall of Fame members

2. Winners of all previous ANA Inspiration tournaments

3. Winners of the U.S. Women's Open, Women's PGA Championship, Women's British Open and The Evian Championship in the previous five years

4. Winners of official LPGA Tour tournaments from the 2016 ANA Inspiration through the week immediately preceding the 2020 ANA Inspiration

5. All players who finished in the top-20 in the previous year's ANA Inspiration

6. All players who finished in the top-5 of the previous year's U.S. Women's Open, Women's PGA Championship, Women's British Open and The Evian Championship

7. Top-80 on the previous year's season-ending LPGA Tour official money list

8. Top-30 on the Women's World Golf Rankings as of 9 March 2019

9. Top-2 players from the previous year's season-ending Ladies European Tour Order of Merit, LPGA of Japan Tour money list and LPGA of Korea Tour money list

10. Top-20 players plus ties on the current year LPGA Tour official money list at the end of the last official tournament prior to the current ANA Inspiration, not otherwise qualified above, provided such players are within the top-80 positions on the current year LPGA Tour official money list at the beginning of the tournament competition

11. Previous year's Louise Suggs Rolex Rookie of the Year

12. Previous year's U.S. Women's Amateur champion, provided she is still an amateur at the beginning of tournament competition

13. Any LPGA Member who did not compete in the previous year's ANA Inspiration major due to injury, illness or maternity, who subsequently received a medical/maternity extension of membership from the LPGA in the previous calendar year, provided they were otherwise qualified to compete in the previous year's ANA Inspiration

14. Up to six sponsor invitations for top-ranked amateur players

Final field
Marina Alex, Brittany Altomare, Pajaree Anannarukarn, Céline Boutier, Ashleigh Buhai, Chella Choi, Chun In-gee, Carlota Ciganda, Cydney Clanton, Perrine Delacour, Austin Ernst, Jodi Ewart Shadoff, María Fassi, Dana Finkelstein, Kristen Gillman, Hannah Green, Jaye Marie Green, Georgia Hall, Nasa Hataoka, Caroline Hedwall, Brooke Henderson, Esther Henseleit, Dani Holmqvist, Caroline Inglis, Ji Eun-hee, Tiffany Joh, Ariya Jutanugarn, Moriya Jutanugarn, Danielle Kang, Yui Kawamoto, Cristie Kerr, Megan Khang, Christina Kim, In-Kyung Kim, Kim Sei-young, Katherine Kirk, Cheyenne Knight, Lydia Ko, Jessica Korda, Nelly Korda, Jennifer Kupcho, Brittany Lang, Nicole Broch Larsen, Bronte Law, Andrea Lee, Lee Mi-hyang, Minjee Lee, Mirim Lee, Stacy Lewis, Brittany Lincicome, Pernilla Lindberg, Lin Xiyu, Yu Liu, Gaby López, Nanna Koerstz Madsen, Leona Maguire, Caroline Masson, Ally McDonald, Stephanie Meadow, Olivia Mehaffey (a), Emilia Migliaccio (a), Azahara Muñoz, Yealimi Noh, Haru Nomura, Anna Nordqvist, Ryann O'Toole, Su-Hyun Oh, Amy Olson, Kaitlyn Papp (a), Annie Park, Park Hee-young, Inbee Park, Park Sung-hyun, Pornanong Phatlum, Gerina Piller, Morgan Pressel, Mel Reid, Gabriela Ruffels (a), Madelene Sagström, Lizette Salas, Sarah Schmelzel, Alena Sharp, Hinako Shibuno, Jenny Shin, Jennifer Song, Klára Spilková, Angela Stanford, Linnea Ström, Thidapa Suwannapura, Elizabeth Szokol, Emma Talley, Kelly Tan, Patty Tavatanakit, Charlotte Thomas, Lexi Thompson, Maria Torres, Ayako Uehara, Anne van Dam, Lindsey Weaver, Amy Yang, Jing Yan, Lei Ye (a), Angel Yin, Rose Zhang (a)

Round summaries

First round
Thursday, September 10, 2020

World number three Nelly Korda returned a six under par round of 66 to secure a one stroke lead at the conclusion of the first round. One stroke behind were two time major winner and 2016 runner-up Chun In-gee, and Madelene Sagström. 2016 Women's PGA Champion Brooke Henderson, and 2017 Women's PGA Champion and world number two Danielle Kang were in a group of five players a stroke further back. Ten players were tied at three under par including former ANA Inspiration winners Lydia Ko (2016) and Brittany Lincicome (2009, 2015).

Second round
Friday, September 11, 2020

Third round
Saturday, September 12, 2020

Brooke Henderson and Nelly Korda were tied for the lead after three rounds. Henderson reached the turn on 30 and had a round of 65, while Korda dropped three strokes at the 5th and 6th holes and finished with a 71. 17-year-old Rose Zhang, the winner of the U.S. Women's Amateur, scored 67 and was tied for 7th place.

Final round
Sunday, September 13, 2020

Overnight leaders Brooke Henderson and Nelly Korda shared and alternated the lead for much of the final round, with neither able to stretch their lead beyond one stroke until a double-bogey on the 13th hole by Henderson was followed by a birdie on the 14th hole by Korda, which moved her to 15 under par. Mirim Lee closed to within one stroke of Korda with a chip-in for birdie on the 16th hole, her second hole-out of the day after chipping in on the 6th hole. Henderson also made a birdie on the 16th to move back to 14 under par as Lee dropped back to 13 under par with a bogey on the 17th.

On the par-5 closing hole, Lee hit her second shot over the green and, after taking a free drop from against the blue wall, proceeded to chip-in for an eagle, her third hole-out of the day, to tie Korda at 15 under par. Playing behind Lee, Korda drove into the rough and had to lay-up short of the water guarding the front of the final green. Henderson was able to go for the green and, like Lee, went over the back with her ball finishing inside the blue wall. Korda could only make par after missing the green with her approach, and Henderson, having taken a free drop, was able to get up-and-down for birdie to tie Korda and Lee and force a three-way playoff for the title.

Rose Zhang, the 2020 U.S. Women's Amateur champion, finish tied for 11th with an 8-under-par 280, taking low-amateur honors. Her 72-hole score of 280 was the lowest amateur score in the tournament's history. Her finish allowed her to reach number 1 in the World Amateur Golf Ranking.

Scorecard
Final round

Cumulative tournament scores, relative to par
{|class="wikitable" span = 50 style="font-size:85%;
|-
|style="background: Red;" width=10|
|Eagle
|style="background: Pink;" width=10|
|Birdie
|style="background: PaleGreen;" width=10|
|Bogey
|style="background: Green;" width=10|
|Double bogey
|}

Playoff
The sudden-death playoff was held on the par-5 18th hole; Mirim Lee won with a birdie on the first extra hole.

{|class="wikitable" span = 50 style="font-size:85%;
|-

|style="background: Pink;" width=10|
|Birdie
|}

Media
Golf Channel televised the championship for the tenth consecutive year.

Notes

References

External links

Coverage on the LPGA Tour official site

Chevron Championship
Golf in California
ANA Inspiration
ANA Inspiration
ANA Inspiration
ANA Inspiration
ANA Inspiration